Zlatko Jovanović (born January 15, 1984) is a Bosnian professional basketball coach and former player who is the current head coach for Komárno of the Slovak League. He represented Bosnia and Herzegovina internationally because his mother is from Bosnia and Herzegovina.

References

External links
 Zlatko Jovanović, Player at eurobasket.com
 Zlatko Jovanović, Coach at eurobasket.com
 Zlatko Jovanović at realgm.com
 Zlatko Jovanović at proballers.com

1984 births
Living people
Bosnia and Herzegovina basketball coaches
Bosnia and Herzegovina men's basketball players
Bosnia and Herzegovina expatriate sportspeople in Romania
BC Prievidza players
KK Igokea players
KK Novi Sad players
KK Sloboda Tuzla players
KK Bosna Royal players
OKK Spars players
OKK Sloboda Tuzla players
OKK Borac players
KK Borac Banja Luka players
Point guards
Sportspeople from Zrenjanin
Serbs of Bosnia and Herzegovina
Serbian people of Bosnia and Herzegovina descent
Serbian expatriate basketball people in Bosnia and Herzegovina
Serbian expatriate basketball people in France
Serbian expatriate basketball people in Hungary
Serbian expatriate basketball people in Iran
Serbian expatriate basketball people in Romania
Serbian expatriate basketball people in Slovakia
Serbian men's basketball coaches
Serbian men's basketball players